Mădăraș ( or colloquially Madaras,) is a commune in Mureș County, Transylvania, Romania. It became an independent commune when it split from Band in 2004. The commune is composed of two villages, Fânațele Mădărașului (Szénáságy) and Mădăraș. Fânațele Mădărașului village was transferred to Mădăraș from Band Commune in 2011.

Mădăraș has an absolute Székely Hungarian majority. For demographics see Band.

History 

It formed part of the Székely Land region of the historical Transylvania province. Until 1918, the village belonged to the Maros-Torda County of the Kingdom of Hungary. After the Treaty of Trianon of 1920, it became part of Romania.

See also 
 List of Hungarian exonyms (Mureș County)

References

Communes in Mureș County
Localities in Transylvania